Semblante Urbano is the name of the sixth album from El Roockie and the first one under Mas Flow Inc. The album was released on February 12, 2008. The album combines the dimensions of his experiences with urban rhythms such as reggaeton, dancehall, hip hop & reggae. It was considered one of the most anticipated albums in the reggaeton in the Hispanophone world. Luny of the production duo said in an interview that Banista "...has lyrics that can cut veins." Semblante Urbano: La Otra Cara De La Calle is the re-edition of the original album set to be released sometime in 2009. This re-edition will contain the original 14 tracks from the standard edition plus 2 remixes and an additional 5 new songs. It will also contain a DVD with the music videos from the singles plus an interview with El Roockie.

Track listing

Standard Edition

References

2008 albums
El Roockie albums
Albums produced by Luny Tunes
Albums produced by Noriega